Zir Tang (also Romanized as Zīr Tang; also known as Zīrtang Bījanvand) is a village in Bijnavand Rural District, in the Zagros District of Chardavol County, Ilam Province, Iran. At the 2006 census, its population was 501, in 110 families. The village was chosen to be the new capital city of Bijnavand Rural District after the village of Balaveh, The previous capital was upgraded to a village and was chosen to become the capital city of Zagros District, established on June 30, 2013. The village is populated by Kurds.

References 

Populated places in Chardavol County
Kurdish settlements in Ilam Province